Alexis Tibidi may refer to:

 Alexis Tibidi (footballer, born 1975), Cameroonian football midfielder
 Alexis Tibidi (footballer, born 2003), French football forward, and son of footballer born 1975